Moncton Christian Academy is a Christian school located in Moncton, New Brunswick, Canada.

References

External links
Official School Website
Anglophone East School District Website

Schools in Moncton
Christian schools in Canada